Buffalo is an unincorporated community and census-designated place in eastern Valley Township, Guernsey County, Ohio, United States. As of the 2010 census it had a population of 401. It has a post office with the ZIP code 43722. It lies along State Route 313.

Demographics

History
Buffalo was originally called "Hartford", and under the latter name was platted in 1836. A post office called Buffalo has been in operation since 1839.

Notable person
 Howard E. Faught - judge and Ohio Supreme Court member

References

Census-designated places in Ohio
Census-designated places in Guernsey County, Ohio